Jess Robbins (April 30, 1886 – March 11, 1973) was an American film director, writer and producer. He directed more than 70 films between 1913 and 1927. He was the first director to direct Laurel and Hardy in the same motion picture, namely The Lucky Dog.

Selected filmography

 His New Job (1915)
 A Night Out (1915)
 The Champion (1915)
 A Jitney Elopement (1915)
 The Tramp (1915)
 By the Sea (1915)
 Work (1915)
 A Woman (1915)
 The Bank (1915)
 Shanghaied (1915)
 A Night in the Show (1915)
 Police (1916)
 Burlesque on Carmen (1916)
 Triple Trouble (1918)
 Fists and Fodder (1920)
 Pals and Pugs (1920)
 He Laughs Last (1920)
 Springtime (1920)
 The Decorator (1920)
 The Trouble Hunter (1920)
 His Jonah Day (1920)
 The Backyard (1920)
 The Nuisance (1921)
 The Mysterious Stranger (1921)
 The Blizzard (1921)
 The Tourist (1921)
 The Lucky Dog (1921)
 A Front Page Story (1922)
 The Ladder Jinx (1922)
 Too Much Business (1922)
 The Law Forbids(1924)
 Should Sailors Marry? (1925)
 The Business of Love (1925)
 A Little Bit of Fluff (1928)

External links

1886 births
1973 deaths
American film directors
American male screenwriters
Writers from Dayton, Ohio
Screenwriters from Ohio
Film producers from Ohio
20th-century American male writers
20th-century American screenwriters